The Musée des Jacobins is a museum in Saint-Sever, France, housed in part of the former Jacobin abbey in the town.

Its exhibits include several 4th- to 7th-century marble capitals from the 'butte de Morlane' and archaeological objects from the 4th-century Roman villa at Gleyzia d'Augreilh and the abbey itself, as well as a collection of historic postcards of Saint-Sever and the Saint-Sever Beatus, an 11th-century Benedictine illuminated manuscript from Saint-Sever Abbey and the only manuscript of its genre.

Sources
 Saint-Sever, Cap de Gascogne, guide de découverte, édité par l'Office de tourisme du Cap de Gascogne

Museums in Landes (department)